The 2021 Tour des Alpes-Maritimes et du Var was a road cycling stage race that took place between 19 and 21 February 2021 in the French departments of Alpes-Maritimes and Var. The race was rated as a 2.1 event as part of the 2021 UCI Europe Tour and was the 53rd edition of the Tour des Alpes-Maritimes et du Var cycling race.

Mollema won the first stage, beating a reduced peloton in a sprint up the third ascent of the Col de Gourdon and taking the first leader's jersey. Woods, who had finished fourth on the first stage only one second behind Mollema, won on the short but steep final climb in Fayence on stage two with enough of a margin over Mollema, who had finished second, to take over the leader's jersey. Heading into the final stage, Brambilla had managed to keep pace with the race leaders; despite being in 17th place, he was only 13 seconds behind Woods. Brambilla was a part of the third stage's main breakaway group of 16 riders, but as the group began to disintegrate on the last categorized climb, the Col de la Madone, he attacked, with only Valentin Madouas able to follow. With around 11 kilometers left, he attacked again, and this time Madouas was unable to keep up. Brambilla pushed on over the last climb, the uncategorized Col de Nice, and managed to hold on for the stage win. Despite Woods' best efforts to maintain his lead, he and Mollema finished in a group 18 seconds behind Brambilla, giving the Italian the overall win.

Teams 
Eleven of the nineteen UCI WorldTeams, eight UCI ProTeams, and three UCI Continental teams made up the twenty-two teams that participated in the race. From a total of 150 riders, 117 finished the race.

UCI WorldTeams

 
 
 
 
 
 
 
 
 
 
 

UCI ProTeams

 
 
 
 
 
 
 
 

UCI Continental Teams

Route

Stages

Stage 1 
19 February 2021 – Biot to Gourdon,

Stage 2 
20 February 2021 – Fayence to Fayence,

Stage 3 
21 February 2021 – Blausasc to Blausasc,

Classification leadership table

Final classification standings

General classification

Points classification

Mountains classification

Young rider classification

Team classification

References

Sources

External links 
 

2021
Tour des Alpes-Maritimes et du Var
Tour des Alpes-Maritimes et du Var
Tour des Alpes-Maritimes et du Var